Tanjung Priok Access Toll Road is a toll road that provides direct access to or from Tanjung Priok Port, which is part of Jakarta Outer Ring Road 2 road network in Jakarta, Indonesia. This 11.4 km highway is part of the Jabodetabek toll road network system connected to the Jakarta Outer Ring Road and Jakarta Inner Ring Road. The toll road was inaugurated on 15 April 2017.

Sections
East Section (E)1- Rorotan to Cilincing (3,4 km)
East Section(E)2- Cilincing to Jampea (2,74 km)
East Section (E)2A- Cilincing to Simpang Jampea (1,92 km)
North-South Section (NS) Link- Yos Sudarso to Simpang Jampea (2,24 km)
North-South (NS) Direct Ramp- (1,1 km)

Construction
The Tanjung Priok access toll road project is funded through JICA loans with a total investment of Rp 4.5 trillion and a construction budget of Rp 3.5 trillion. The project was originally scheduled for completion by the end of 2015, but certainly not achieved. The first phase of the loan agreement was on March 31, 2005 with a value of Rp 2.236 trillion, while phase 2 was done on March 29, 2006 with a value of Rp 2.263 trillion. Due to the old planning and auction process, price increases and loan budgets are insufficient to finance the project, eventually a breakthrough by creating new packaging. From the new packaging:
Section E1 is conducted by SMCC-Hutama Karya JO, contract value Rp 662.5 Billion
 E2 Section implemented by Kajima-Waskita Karya JO, contract value Rp 1.04 trillion 

E2A Section implemented by Obayashi-Jaya Construction JO, contract value Rp 1.06 trillion.
Section NS Yos Link is implemented by SMCC-Hutama Karya JO, contract value Rp 489B. 
The NS Direct Ramp section is implemented by Tobishima-Wijaya Karya JO, the contract value is Rp 255 billion
Section E1, which started its operation on March 30, 2010, officially operates without tariff on April 17, 2011, while the other section is still under construction.

Further Expansion
There were plans to build the Section West 1 Priok of West Priok toll road with Jampea-Kampung Bahari and Section West 2 Kampung Bahari of Tanjung Priok Port which was scheduled to be implemented in 2020, however this project wasn't considered as urgent as sections E1, E2, and NS due to the current operating sections are considered sufficient to meet the needs of roads in the region at this time.

Opening
Tanjung Priok Access Toll Road was finally opened to the public after it was inaugurated by President Joko Widodo on April 15, 2017. The toll road is managed temporarily by PT Jalantol Lingkarluar Jakarta (JLJ) on Kebon Bawang-Rorotan and PT Citra Marga Nusaphala Persada at segment of Kebon Bawang-SS Plumpang before being managed permanently by PT Hutama Karya. After inaugurated by President Joko Widodo, this toll road was free for 1 month.

See also
Jakarta Inner Ring Road
Jakarta Outer Ring Road
Jakarta Outer Ring Road 2

References

Buildings and structures in Jakarta
Toll roads in Indonesia
Transport in Jakarta